Love, Lizzo is an  American documentary film directed by Doug Pray  released through HBO Max on November 24, 2022.

Synopsis 
An official press from HBO Max stated, "the journey of a trailblazing superstar who has become the movement the world desperately needed just by being herself. The HBO Max documentary shares the inspirational story behind her humble beginnings to her meteoric rise with an intimate look into the moments that shaped her hard-earned rise to fame, success, love and international stardom."

Production 
On May 18, 2022, Lizzo announced and showed a teaser at the Madison Square Garden that she will have a documentary with HBO Max. It was also announced that Doug Pray will direct and produce the upcoming documentary, with Lizzo as a executive producer through her production company, Lizzobangers.

Promotion 
Love, Lizzo was made available through HBO Max on November 24, 2022. The documentary was also made available through the Australian streaming service, Binge.

References 

American documentary films
2022 documentary films
Australian documentary films